Broadridge Financial Solutions is a public corporate services and financial technology company founded in 2007 as a spin-off from management software company :Automatic Data Processing. Broadridge supplies public companies with proxy statements, annual reports and other financial documents, and shareholder communications solutions, such as virtual annual meetings.

History 
Legislation passed in the 1970s in the United States mandated two processes for securities and their transfer: immobilization and dematerialization. These processes required physical stock certificates and other paper securities to be kept in bulk by intermediaries, and required the sale and ownership of securities to be accomplished through chains of transaction records instead of possession of paper certificates. While enabling increased securities trading and rapid rises in stock ownership, these changes had the effect of separating companies from their shareholders, and putting intermediaries between them.

Increased stock-market trading led to greater need for such intermediaries, and the need for shareholders to vote by proxy via the intermediaries instead of directly. This in turn led to a new industry which managed the shareholder voting process.  Prior to this new industry, banks and brokers had typically maintained in-house proxy departments for handling these processes. Even after the move to electronic certificates eliminated the need for intermediaries, the intermediaries have continued to exist.

By the mid 1990s, the proxy voting and shareholder communications services industry was dominated by Automatic Data Processing (ADP).  At the end of March, 2007, ADP spun-out the entirety of their shareholder communications activities, resulting in the formation of Broadridge Financial Solutions.

In the wake of the financial crisis of 2007–2008, Congress evaluated many aspects of corporate governance, including shareholder communications and proxy voting. In 2010 a report submitted to the House Committee on Financial Services by a coalition headed by Business Roundtable noted the near monopoly position of Broadridge in handling proxy voting.  In 2010, the company processed about 350 billion shares for the companies for which it provided services.  By 2013, the company had retained its predominant position in the proxy processing market.

In the summer of 2016, Broadridge acquired the North America Customer Communications (NACC) unit of DST Systems, a Kansas City-based business services provider, which provided the company with addressing information for about 75% of all public company shareholders in the United States and Canada.  Later in 2016, Broadridge bought M&O Systems, a small Manhattan-based financial services company. In 2016, the company acquired Spence Johnson, an institutional financial flow data intelligence firm co-founded by CEO at the time, Magnus Spence. This was a strategic investment by Broadridge, allowing for the combination of Broadridge's retail data and analytics with Spence Johnson's data and analytics focused on money flows between firms, two distinct intelligence dimensions. In November 2019, Broadridge announced their acquisition of ClearStructure Financial Technology, a global provider of portfolio management solutions for the private debt markets. In March 2020, Broadridge completed its acquisition of FundsLibrary, a leader in fund document and data dissemination in the European market.

See also
 List of S&P 500 companies

References

Further reading

External links

Financial services companies established in 2007
Companies listed on the New York Stock Exchange
Business process outsourcing companies
ADP (company)
Companies based in Newark, New Jersey
Corporate spin-offs